Charaxes kahldeni is a butterfly in the family Nymphalidae. It is found in northern Angola, the Democratic Republic of the Congo, the Republic of the Congo, Gabon, Cameroon, the Central African Republic, Uganda and southern Sudan. The habitat consists of forests.

Description
Very similar to Charaxes zoolina. Hindwing underside in cell 1c with a black longitudinal stripe, which extends almost to the anal angle and joins with the similar median strip.

Description in Seitz
Ch. kahldeni. Hindwing beneath in cellule lc with a black 
longitudinal stripe, extending from  the base nearly to the anal angle and posteriorly joined to the median stripe, which is also black- kahldeni Homeyer and Dew. (= W-brunnea Baker). Hindwing above only with a fine marginal line and three submarginal spots (in cellules lc-3) black, beneath, in addition to the two stripes already mentioned, with a thick black sub marginal line and a fine marginal line. Cameroons to Angola. In f. homeyeri Dewthe basal half of the forewing above is whitish, the apical part yellow-brown with rust-brown marginal band spotted with yellow; hindwing above whitish with a rust-brown marginal band about 3 mm. in breadth. Under surface brownish, 
sprinkled with darker dots, as in the type-form with longitudinal stripe in 1 c and a median band, but with dark dots instead of the submarginal stripes. Cameroons to Angola; rare.

Taxonomy
Charaxes kahldeni is a member of the species group Charaxes zoolina. 
The clade members are:

Charaxes zoolina nominate
Charaxes kahldeni

The group differs from all the others in Charaxes in the male having a tail on vein 2, but the female having two long tails on veins 2 and 4. There are two different forms, one with black markings on a greenish-white base colour (wet-season form) and one with reddish-brown markings on red-yellow whitish colour (dry-season form). These forms can be from eggs of the same female.

References

Victor Gurney Logan Van Someren, 1974 Revisional notes on African Charaxes (Lepidoptera: Nymphalidae). Part IX. Bulletin of the British Museum of Natural History (Entomology) 29 (8):415-487.

External links
Pteron Images
Charaxes khaldeni images at Consortium for the Barcode of Life
Images of C. kahldeni Royal Museum for Central Africa (Albertine Rift Project)

Butterflies described in 1882
kahldeni
Butterflies of Africa
Taxa named by Hermann Dewitz